Ḥadīth in Islam are the record of the words, actions, and the silent approval, of the Islamic prophet Muhammad

Hadith may also refer to:

Hadith Sahih al Bukhari
Hadith studies, several religious disciplines used in the study and evaluation of the Islamic hadith
A stylization of Hadit
Hadith Qudse

See also
Ahl al-Hadith, also known as traditionalists and traditionists, 2nd/ 3rd Islamic centuries as a movement of hadith scholars who considered the Quran and authentic hadith to be the only authority in matters of law and creed
Ahl-i Hadith or Ahl-e-Hadith, a religious movement that emerged in Northern India in the mid-nineteenth century